The IIJL World Junior Lacrosse Championship is an annual international box lacrosse tournament for players aged 20 and under.

History 
The first formal Junior competition was held in 2015 in Six Nations, ON. Originally, the Junior tournament was to be held in conjunction with the World Indoor Lacrosse Championship in Buffalo, NY. However, when Buffalo was removed from the 2015 WILC as one of two host locations - all games moved to Syracuse/Onondaga Nation, the Junior tournament was removed. With flights planned, the Junior Tournament was moved to Six Nations, ON and named the 2015 U19 World Lacrosse Challenge and featured 12 teams, including regional squads from Canada and Iroquois. Junior national teams from Czech Republic, Israel, and the United States along with German club Deutschland Adler rounded out the field. Canada West won the gold medal game while Iroquois West captured the bronze medal.

International Indoor Junior Lacrosse purchased the rights to the tournament in 2016 and it was rebranded to its current name the IIJL World Junior Lacrosse Championship. Eight teams would compete in the second edition which was again held at Iroquois Lacrosse Arena. Czech Republic and United States returned along with newcomer Ireland. Iroquois West would defeat the Junior CLax All Stars 9-8 in the gold medal game while Iroquois Grand River took bronze on their home floor.

After a one-year hiatus the tournament return in 2018 and take place in Saskatoon at SaskTel Centre. For the first time in the championship's history each country would be represented by individual teams. Three teams took part (Canada, Iroquois, United States) in the four-day event with Canada winning its second gold medal.

The event returned to Ontario in 2019 - this time in Mississauga at Paramount Fine Foods Centre. The championship doubled in size from three to six countries. Australia would make its debut at the tournament, one of six national teams. 

The 2021 IIJL Word Junior Lacrosse Championship was a cumulative goal three game series against Canada East and Canada West due to the global pandemic resulting in other countries not being able to travel or restrictions that prevented them from participating. Games aired live on TSN 2 and TSN Direct.

Champions

References

External links 
 World Junior Lacrosse Championship website

2015 in lacrosse
Lacrosse of the Iroquois Confederacy
World Lacrosse Championship